Clifton is a town located on Union Island, which is part of the Grenadines island chain of Saint Vincent and the Grenadines. It is located on the island's southeast coast.

Transportation
Clifton is served by Union Island Airport.

References

Scott, C. R. (ed.) (2005) Insight guide: Caribbean (5th edition). London: Apa Publications.

Populated places in Saint Vincent and the Grenadines